Tyrese Jeffrey Martin (born March 7, 1999) is an American professional basketball player for the Atlanta Hawks of the National Basketball Association (NBA). He played college basketball for the Rhode Island Rams and the UConn Huskies.

High school career
Martin played basketball for William Allen High School in Allentown, Pennsylvania. As a senior, he averaged 21.3 points and 11.4 rebounds per game. Martin was named Eastern Pennsylvania Conference (EPC) MVP, and led his team to its first EPC title since 2006. 

He played a postgraduate season at Massanutten Military Academy in Woodstock, Virginia to gain more exposure from college programs. In 2017, he committed to playing college basketball for Rhode Island over offers from Minnesota, Utah and Seton Hall, among others.

College career
As a freshman at Rhode Island, Martin averaged 8.1 points and 5.2 rebounds per game. On February 26, 2020, he posted season-highs of 24 points and 16 rebounds in a 76–75 win against Fordham. Martin averaged 12.8 points and 7 rebounds per game as a sophomore. 

For his junior season, he transferred to UConn to play under head coach Dan Hurley, who had recruited him to Rhode Island. During the offseason, he worked a full-time job at a warehouse in Allentown after his mother was laid off from her job during the COVID-19 pandemic. Martin was granted a waiver from the NCAA for immediate eligibility at UConn. However, he was suspended by the NCAA for the season opener against Central Connecticut for playing in an unsanctioned summer league game. As a junior, Martin averaged 10.3 points and 7.5 rebounds per game. On December 1, 2021, he was ruled out after spraining his wrist several games previously. On December 21, 2021, Martin scored a career-high 25 points and passed the 1,000 point mark in a 78–70 win over Marquette. 

On March 22, 2022, Martin declared for the 2022 NBA draft, forgoing his remaining college eligibility.

Professional career

Atlanta Hawks (2022–present)
Martin was drafted by the Golden State Warriors with the 51st overall pick in the 2022 NBA draft and was subsequently traded to the Atlanta Hawks. On July 16, 2022, he signed his rookie scale contract with the Hawks.

Career statistics

College

|-
| style="text-align:left;"| 2018–19
| style="text-align:left;"| Rhode Island
| 33 || 19 || 27.0 || .418 || .311 || .648 || 5.2 || 1.0 || .8 || .3 || 8.1
|-
| style="text-align:left;"| 2019–20
| style="text-align:left;"| Rhode Island
| 30 || 30 || 34.2 || .433 || .321 || .662 || 7.0 || 1.1 || 1.1 || .3 || 12.8
|-
| style="text-align:left;"| 2020–21
| style="text-align:left;"| UConn
| 22 || 21 || 30.1 || .440 || .320 || .672 || 7.5 || 1.0 || 1.0 || .5 || 10.3
|-
| style="text-align:left;"| 2021–22
| style="text-align:left;"| UConn
| 29 || 29 || 32.1 || .449 || .430 || .689 || 7.5 || 1.9 || .8 || .5 || 13.6
|- class="sortbottom"
| style="text-align:center;" colspan="2"| Career
| 114 || 99 || 30.8 || .435 || .346 || .670 || 6.7 || 1.3 || .9 || .4 || 11.1

References

External links

UConn Huskies bio
Rhode Island Rams bio

1999 births
Living people
American men's basketball players
Atlanta Hawks players
Basketball players from Pennsylvania
Golden State Warriors draft picks
Sportspeople from Allentown, Pennsylvania
Shooting guards
Small forwards
Rhode Island Rams men's basketball players
UConn Huskies men's basketball players
William Allen High School alumni